Elections were held in Peterborough County, Ontario on November 13, 2006 in conjunction with municipal elections across the province.

Asphodel-Norwood

Cavan-Millbrook-North Monaghan

Douro-Dummer

Galway-Cavendish and Harvey

Havelock-Belmont-Methuen

North Kawartha

Otonabee-South Monaghan

Smith-Ennismore-Lakefield

Source: Peterborough County: Who won what where, MyKawartha.com, 14 November 2006, accessed 20 January 2011.

References

2006 Ontario municipal elections